The Caribbean, sometimes also called the West Indies lies between the continental North and South America.  See History of the Caribbean.

Caribbean may also refer to:

Blocs 
Association of Caribbean States (ACS)
Caribbean Community (CARICOM)
Organisation of Eastern Caribbean States (OECS)

Companies 
Caribbean Airlines, based in Trinidad and Tobago
Caribbean Star Airlines, based in Antigua and Barbuda
Caribbean Sun Airlines, based in Puerto Rico it is the sister airline of Caribbean Star
Royal Caribbean International, a cruise ship agency based in the United States

Culture 
Afro-Caribbean, various meanings
Anglophone Caribbean, persons in the Caribbean that speak English as their mother tongue
British African-Caribbean people, residents of the UK of West Indian background whose ancestors are of African extraction
British Indo-Caribbean people, residents of the UK who were born in the Caribbean and whose ancestors are of Indian extraction
Caribbean cuisine, a blend of cuisine found in the Caribbean / West Indies
Caribbean English, the dialect of British English spoken in the Caribbean/West Indies
Indo-Caribbean, sometimes used to describe an ethnic group in the Caribbean

Other 
Caribbean stud poker, a popular casino table game
Caribbean Princess, a cruise ship owned by the Princess Cruises company
Packard Caribbean, a luxury convertible made during the 1950s
Pirates of the Caribbean, a franchise that includes several films and video games
The Caribbean, first book in the series Pirates of the Caribbean: Legends of the Brethren Court
Caribbean (novel), an historical novel by James A. Michener
Caribbean, an alternative title for the 1952 film Caribbean Gold
Caribbean (board game), a 2004 board game
The Caribbean (band), an American experimental pop group from Washington, D.C.
Caribbean (1953 film), a 1953 drama film
 Caribbean Gold, a 1952 American pirate film, also known as Caribbean